The white-crested spadebill (Platyrinchus platyrhynchos) is a species of passerine bird in the tyrant flycatcher family Tyrannidae. It is found in Bolivia, Brazil, Colombia, Ecuador, French Guiana, Guyana, Peru, Suriname, and Venezuela. Its natural habitat is subtropical or tropical moist lowland forests.

Taxonomy
The white-crested spadebill was formally described in 1788 by the German naturalist Johann Friedrich Gmelin in his revised and expanded edition of Carl Linnaeus's Systema Naturae. He placed it with the todies in the genus Todus and coined the binomial name Todus platyrhynchos. The specific epithet is from Ancient Greek platurrhunkhos meaning "broad-billed" or "broad-beaked" (from platus meaning "broad" or "wide" and rhunkhos meaning "bill"). Gmelin based his description on the "Todi Leucocephali" that had been described and illustrated in 1769 by the German naturalist Peter Simon Pallas. Pallas did not specify a locality but this was subsequently designated as Surinam. The white-crested spadebill is now one of seven spadebills placed in the genus Platyrinchus that was introduced in 1805 by Anselme Gaëtan Desmarest.

Four subspecies are recognised:
 P. p. platyrhynchos (Gmelin, JF, 1788) – east Colombia through the Guianas and north Brazil
 P. p. senex Sclater, PL & Salvin, 1880 – east Ecuador, east Peru, north Bolivia and extreme west Brazil
 P. p. nattereri Hartert, EJO & Hellmayr, 1902 – central south Amazonian Brazil
 P. p. amazonicus Berlepsch, 1912 – east Amazonian Brazil

References

white-crested spadebill
Birds of the Amazon Basin
Birds of the Guianas
white-crested spadebill
white-crested spadebill
Birds of Brazil
Taxonomy articles created by Polbot